Dim sum is a type of cuisine, a range of small dishes in small pieces served typically for breakfast, brunch, lunch, in Cantonese cuisine.

Dim Sum or dimsum or variation, may also refer to:

 Yum cha (aka go dim sum), the Cantonese practise of going out for dim sum
 Dim sum brunch, the Cantonese restaurant practise of serving dim sum cuisine "at dim sum"
 Dim Sum Building, Singapore; a university building shaped like dim sum bamboo steamer baskets
 Dim sum bond, a financial instrument, a bond denominated in renminbi (RMB, CNY, ¥; 元;) Chinese yuan, issued outside of the People's Republic of China
 Dimsum Entertainment, a television station in Malaysia; see List of television stations in Malaysia
 Dimsum Magazine, a Chinese and English language LGBT magazine; see List of LGBT periodicals
 Dim Sum: A Little Bit of Heart, a 1985 U.S. comedy film

See also

 Project DMSSM ("Designed, Modernized and Streamlined Supply Chain and Manufacturing", pronounced as "dimsum") of the Chinese restaurant chain in the Philippines, Chowking
 
 
 
 
 
 Dim (disambiguation)
 Sum (disambiguation)